Said Naciri (also known as Saeed El Nasry or Saïd Naciri) (born in Casablanca in 1960) is a Moroccan actor, comedian and producer.

Biography
He has appeared in a number of Moroccan TV programs and feature films.

In 2000, his play 'Thief but honest' was showcased in the theater. He produced his first feature film is Ouled Derb (in French Le Pote) which was directed by Hassan Benjelloun. In 2003, he embarked on a career as a director with his feature film Les Bandits where he holds the male lead role.

Filmography
 2003 : The Bandits
 2005 : Game with Wolves
 2006 : Abdou among the Almohads
 2009 : "a husband to rent"
 2010 : Al khattaf
 2011 : A Moroccan in Paris
 2013: Sara
 2015: The Transporters

Television 
Saïd Naciri directed many telefilms and TV debates for Moroccan television.
 Ana ou khouya ou Mratou in 1998 on TVM
 Ana ou Mrati ou Nsabi in 1999 on TVM
 Rbib in 2004 sur 2M, with the participation of Mustapha El Atrassi.
 Al Awni in 2005 on 2M, with the participation of Siham Assif, Amina Rachid.
 Al Awni Deuxième partie in 2007 on 2M
 Nsiib Al Haj Azzooz in 2009 on 2M
 Le Bandit(la série) in 2011 on 2M
 l'khetaf in 2011
 Tebdal Lemnazel in 2014 on Al Aoula

Televised debates
 Alach la in 1999 on TVM
 Ataja in 2000 on the TVM

One man show
 Di KOKO in 1989
 Tetanos in 1995
 My friends the ministers in 2003
 Moroccan 100% in 2007
 Lalla el houkouma in 2014
 Do you speak english in 2016

Other works
 Malhama: Abtal Al Watan music video

References

External links

Moroccan comedians
Moroccan businesspeople
20th-century Moroccan male actors

21st-century Moroccan male actors
Moroccan male film actors
Moroccan male television actors
1960 births
Living people